The 2012 ICC World Twenty20 Qualifier was played in early 2012 as a part of ICC World Twenty20 Qualifier series. This edition of the qualifier for the 2012 ICC World Twenty20 was an expanded version comprising ten qualifiers from regional Twenty20 tournaments, in addition to the six ODI/Twenty20 status countries. It was staged in the UAE.

ICC Associate and Affiliate Members from around the globe had the opportunity to qualify for the ICC World Twenty20 2012 in Sri Lanka. Regional qualifying events were held in the five regions to provide a qualifying pathway to the 16-team qualifier which took place in early 2012 in the United Arab Emirates. The six Associate/Affiliate Members with ODI status – Afghanistan, Canada, Ireland, Kenya, Netherlands and Scotland – have automatically qualified for this event.

Three teams from the Asia region, two teams from Africa, Americas and Europe, and one team from East Asia-Pacific had the opportunity to qualify for the ICC World Twenty20 2012 global qualifier. Some ODI status Associate/Affiliate sides took part in these qualifying events, along with emerging teams from ICC Full Members (e.g., South Africa and Zimbabwe). In such cases, the highest placed Associate and Affiliate sides from these events progressed to the global qualifier, based on the qualifying spots available.

The tournament was won by Ireland, who defeated Afghanistan in the final, in a rematch of the 2010 ICC World Twenty20 Qualifier. Both the teams qualified for the 2012 ICC World Twenty20 in Sri Lanka. Paul Stirling was the highest run-getter with 357 runs including the second-fastest half-century ever in T20I match (17 balls) in the final, while Dawlat Zadran with 17 wickets was the highest wicket-taker. Namibia's Raymond van Schoor was the Player of the Tournament.

Entrants
Qualification for 2012 World Twenty20 Qualifier involves 81 ICC member countries to battle their way from regional Division 3 to Division 1 and eventually World Twenty20 Qualifier. Three of the 81 teams are already qualified but are participating as a part of division members. Pre-qualified teams are Afghanistan, Canada, and Kenya. Zimbabwe A team is involved as a part of Africa Division 1 but as a full member Zimbabwe national cricket team is already qualified for 2012 ICC World Twenty20.

Regional qualification
Africa (ACA)

Asia (ACC)

Americas (ACA)

East Asia and Pacific (EAP)

Europe (ECC)

† Switzerland were due to take part, but withdrew due to internal difficulties, and were automatically relegated.

Qualified teams
The ten qualified teams from regional Twenty20 competitions played in the 2012 World Twenty20 Qualifier along with the six associate teams that had automatically qualified. Originally, after the cut of associates from the ICC Cricket World Cup 2015, it was decided to give associates more of a chance in Twenty20 format and expanded the main tournament to 16 teams with top 6 teams from the Qualifier going to the World Cup but after the re-inclusion of Associates in the 50-Over World Cup in 2015, the earlier format was retained and only the top two teams from this event qualifying for the 2012 ICC World Twenty20.

ACA
 
 
 
ACA
 
 
 

ACC
 
 
 
 
EAP
 

ECC

Match officials
The International Cricket Council announced the umpires that would officiate in this tournament. There would be 4 Regional Match Referees, plus 12 umpires, 7 of which are of the Elite Panel (which includes Simon Taufel, a five-time ICC Umpire of the Year Award recipient), and also 5 ICC Assiciate and Affiliate Panel of Umpires.

Umpires
 Ahsan Raza
 Buddhi Pradhan
 Chris Gaffaney
  Ian Ramage
 Joel Wilson
 Johan Cloete
 Mark Hawthorne
 Ranmore Martinesz
 Roger Dill
 Sarika Prasad
 Simon Taufel
 Sudhir Asnani

Match referees
 Adrian Griffith
 David Jukes
 Dev Govindjee
 Graeme Labrooy

Format
The tournament, held from 13 to 24 March, has 72 qualifying fixtures. The sixteen teams participating in this tournament has been divided into two groups of eight each. The top team from each group will meet in the first qualifying final with the winner being guaranteed a place in the World Twenty20 Cup 2012 to be held in Sri Lanka. The loser of that match will play the second qualifying final against the winner of a series of playoff matches. The winners of both qualifying finals will meet in the final at Dubai.

Squads

Fixtures and results
The groups were announced by the ICC on 21 December 2011.
Source:ESPNCricinfo
All times are given in Arabian Standard Time – GMT+4 (UTC+4)

Group A

Points table

Results

Group B

Points table

Results

Play-off stage

15th place play-off

11th to 14th place play-offs
11th Place Play-Off Semi-Final 1

11th Place Play-Off Semi-Final 2

13th Place Play-Off

11th Place Play-Off

7th to 10th place play-offs
7th Place Play-Off Semi-Final 1

7th Place Play-Off Semi-Final 2

9th Place Play-Off

7th Place Play-Off

1st to 6th Place play-offs
Elimination Play-Off 1

Elimination Play-Off 2

5th Place Play-Off

Qualifying Final 1

Elimination Semi-Final

Qualifying Final 2

Final

Final standings

Statistics

Most runs
The top five most runs scorers are included in this table.

Most wickets
The following table contains the five leading wicket-takers.

Broadcasting rights
 Global – ESPN Star Sports (Qualifying Finals, Preliminary Final, Tournament Final and six matches in all)
 Scotland – Quipu TV – 14 Group Stage Matches
 Ireland – Setanta Sports – (Qualifying Finals, Preliminary Final, Tournament Final and six matches in all)
 Ireland – RTÉ – Highlights of elimination and qualifying finals
 Afghanistan – Lemar TV – All Qualifiers in Pashto
 Pakistan – PTV Sports

See also
 Twenty20 World Cup 2012
 2012 ICC World Twenty20
 ICC World Twenty20 Qualifier

References

External links
 Official Site
 Cricinfo Site
 ICC T20 World Cup 2012 Site

2012 Qualifier
ICC World Twenty20 Qualifier
ICC World Twenty20 Qualifier
Cricket in the United Arab Emirates
ICC Men's T20 World Cup Qualifier